Stefan Jan Klajbor (20 October 1924 – 5 July 1991) was an architect and a cultural personage of Bydgoszcz during the 20th century.

Early life and studies
Stefan Jan Klajbor was born in Bydgoszcz on 20 October 1924. He was the son of Jan, a railwayman, and Wanda, née Nowakowski. After graduating from elementary school, he studied at the State High School of Humanities, located at 18/22 Grodzka Street (today's High Seminary of Bydgoszcz Diocese). During German occupation, he was enlisted as a worker: in 1941, he was sentenced to six months of labor camp for economic activity sabotage. From 1942 onwards, he took part in Gray Ranks, an underground resistance movement against the Nazi forces. In May 1943, his group was responsible for the Home Army garrison's communications in Bydgoszcz. Stefan Klajbor, aka Paweł, was the liaison officer of the Garrison Headquarters with the commander of the local Gray Ranks company in Bydgoszcz.

At the end of WWII, Stefan resumed his studies at the High School Nr.2 Nicolaus Copernicus in Bydgoszcz and was graduated in 1946. He then moved to Gdańsk to the faculty of architecture of the University of Technology: in June 1951, he received his university diploma and an architect engineering master's degree.

During his studies (1949-1951), he worked professionally as a referendary at the Maritime Office in Gdynia. After graduation, he was employed for several months as a deputy construction manager at the Municipal Construction department of Gdańsk, between 1951 and 1952. After that stint, Klajbor returned to Bydgoszcz.

Work in Bydgoszcz
From 1952 to 1956 and from 1958 and 1967, Stefan Klajbor worked as a designer and chief engineer at the municipal project office. In 1956, he moved to the Presidium of the Municipal Council in Bydgoszcz and until 1958, he occupied the seat of the main city architect. In the years 1967–1972, Klajbor worked as a senior designer at the Kuyavian-Pomeranian Urban department in Bydgoszcz.

He took in the following years several successive positions in different agencies:
 Office of Studies and Projects Biprokabel (1972-1974 and 1975-1989);
 Bydgoszcz Construction House Complex (1974-1975);
 Municipal Department of Land Management (from 1984);
 Municipal Department of Urban Planning;
 Municipal Department of Architecture and Building Supervision.

In December 1989, Stefan Klajbor was pensioned off.

Associative and political life
Stefan Klajbor was also active in the political and social domains. From 1972 to 1976, he was a member of the Democratic Party and moved between 1977 and 1980 to the Polish United Workers' Party.

He was active in the local branch of the Association of Polish Architects:
 local board chairman (1953-1977);
 member of the competition jury (1957-1958);
 member of the college of competition judges (1963-1966).

From 1956 onwards, he participated in the Association of the friends Lovers of Bydgoszcz city, managing the work of the urban-architectural department. In the late 1970s, Klajbor set up and chaired the Social Committee for the Rescue of Starofarny Cemetery Monuments, succeeding in listing the cemetery on the Kuyavian-Pomeranian Voivodeship Heritage List (Nr.601242 A/879, June 28, 1983).

Personal life
Stefan Klajbor married Maria Apolobia, née Biernacki in 1949. They divorced in 1972.

They had three girls (Danuta-1951, Barbara-1962, Ewa-1966) and two sons (Leszek-1953, Jerzy-1956).

Stefan Jan Klajbor died in Bydgoszcz on 5 July 1991.

For his realizations and activities, he received many decorations and orders, among which: 
 Golden Cross of Merit (1979);
 Knight's Cross of the Order of Polonia Restituta (1988);
 Medal of the 10th Anniversary of People's Poland;
 Medal of the 30th Anniversary of People's Poland.

Main realizations
 Bydgoszcz Pomeranian Philharmonic Ignacy Jan Paderewski, 1954–1958;
 Renovation of the Museum in Grudziądz, ancient Palace of the Abbots in Grudziądz, 1956;
 Building of the local branch of Polish Federation of Engineering Associations at Jagiellońska street, 1972–1974;
 Modernization project of the Cable Factory in Ożarów Mazowiecki, 1973;
 Project for the Culture and Recreation Forest Park in Bydgoszcz,, 1974.

He was also the general designer of the Selfa Housing Estate in Szczecin.

Other plans included, among others:
 reconstruction and expansion of Bydgoszcz Teatr Polski;
 renovation of the Błonie district;
 renovation of the at 2 and 4 Jezuicka Street in Bydgoszcz.

Gallery

See also

 Bydgoszcz
 Bydgoszcz Architects (1850-1970s)
 List of Polish people
 Pomeranian Philharmonic

References

Bibliography

20th-century Polish architects
Architects from Bydgoszcz
1924 births
1991 deaths
Recipient of the Meritorious Activist of Culture badge